Nationality words link to articles with information on the nation's poetry or literature (for instance, Irish or France).

Events
 Samuel Daniel becomes poet laureate in England this year (on his death in 1619 he is succeeded by Ben Jonson)

Works published

 Robert Allott, Wits Theater of the Little World (third in the "Wits Series"; see also Ling's Politeuphuia 1597; Meres' Palladis Tamia 1598; Wrednot, Palladis Palatium 1604)
 Nicholas Breton, The Passions of the Spirit, published anonymously
 Thomas Churchyard, The Fortunate Farewel to the Most Forward and Noble Earle of Essex
 Samuel Daniel, The Poeticall Essayes of Sam. Danyel, including The Civiill Wars in five books (see also The First Fowre Bookes 1595, Works [six books] 1601; Civile Wares [eight books] 1609)
Sir John Davies:
 Hymnes of Astraea, in Acrosticke Verse, published anonymously
 Nosce Teipsum (see also Nosce Teipsum 1619, 1622)
 Michael Drayton, Idea
 Christopher Marlowe, translator (posthumous) and Sir John Davies, All Ovids Elegies, three books, publication year uncertain, contains epigrams by Davies
 Thomas Middleton, Micro-Cynicon, attributed to Middleton by some scholars
 William Shakespeare, The Passionate Pilgrime; or, Certaine Amorous Sonnets, only two sheets of the first edition are extant; second edition also published this year; contains 20 poems, including versions of Sonnets 138 and 144, and three extracts from Love's Labour's Lost, and poems by others (see also 1612 edition with nine added poems by Thomas Heywood)
 Edmund Spenser, Prothalamion
 Thomas Storer, The Life and Death of Thomas Wolsey Cardinall
 John Weever, Epigrammes in the Oldest Cut, and Newest Fashion

Births
Death years link to the corresponding "[year] in poetry" article:
 September 7 – Jacob Westerbaen (died 1670), Dutch poet
 December 16 – Jacques Vallée, Sieur Des Barreaux (died 1673), French poet

Deaths
Birth years link to the corresponding "[year] in poetry" article:
 January 13 – Edmund Spenser (born 1552), English poet, died in Westminster and was buried, at the expense of the Earl of Essex, in Poets' Corner at Westminster Abbey next to Geoffrey Chaucer; poets carried his coffin, throwing their verses and pens into his grave
 October 16 – Jakob Regnart (born sometime from 1540 to 1545), Franco-Flemish composer who spent most of his career in Austria and Bohemia, where he wrote both sacred and secular music and poetry in German
 Also:
 Jerónimo Bermúdez (born 1530), Spanish dramatist, poet, and playwright
 Giorgio Cichino (born 1514), Italian, Latin-language poet
 Eknath (born 1533), Marathi language religious poet in the Hindu tradition of India
 Shah Hussain (born 1538), Punjabi Sufi poet and Sufi saint; born in Lahore (present-day Pakistan); considered a pioneer of the kafi form of Punjabi poetry
 Dominicus Lampsonius (born 1532), Flemish  humanist, poet, and artist
 Bartholomäus Ringwaldt (born 1532; year of death uncertain), German

See also

 Poetry
 16th century in poetry
 16th century in literature
 Dutch Renaissance and Golden Age literature
 Elizabethan literature
 English Madrigal School
 French Renaissance literature
 Renaissance literature
 Spanish Renaissance literature
 University Wits

Notes

16th-century poetry
Poetry